Modrzewina  is a village in the administrative district of Gmina Goszczyn, within Grójec County, Masovian Voivodeship, in central Poland.

References

Modrzewina